The 2003 FIU Golden Panthers football team represented Florida International University in the 2003 NCAA Division I-AA football season as an NCAA Division I-AA independent school. The Panthers were led by head coach Don Strock in his second season and finished with a record of zero wins and ten losses (0–10). In 2008, the NCAA Division I Committee on Infractions found major violations within the football program and as such vacated the Panthers' two wins from the 2003 season.

Schedule

References

FIU
FIU Panthers football seasons
College football winless seasons
FIU Golden Panthers football